Alexander James Amherst Burnett of Leys (born 30 July 1973) is a Scottish Conservative Party politician who has served as the Member of the Scottish Parliament (MSP) for the Aberdeenshire West constituency since 2016.

Family and background
Alexander Burnett is the son of James Comyn Amherst Burnett of Leys, Chief of the Name and Arms of the House of Burnett, and Fiona Mercedes Phillips. His mother Fiona is the daughter of Harold Phillips and Georgina, Lady Kennard, and a sister of the Duchesses of  Abercorn and Westminster. Burnett is a fourth-great-grandson of Nicholas I of Russia on his mother's side, and through the same line also claims descent from the Russian noblemen Abram Petrovich Hannibal and Alexander Pushkin. He was educated at Eton College and Newcastle University, where he graduated with an LL.B.

Career

After graduating Burnett worked for a decade in Azerbaijan, before returning to Scotland where he started a number of businesses with his family, including property developer North Banchory Limited and its biomass renewable energy subsidiary Hill of Banchory ESCo Limited (HoBESCo). Aside from this, Burnett is also the owner of an estate in Aberdeenshire, and the beneficiary of a couple of property-owning trusts, that in total have an estimated value of almost £30 million.

Burnett stood as the Conservative Party's candidate in the West Aberdeenshire and Kincardine consistency in the 2015 general election, losing the seat to the SNP's Stuart Donaldson, receiving 28.8% of the vote compared to Donaldson's 41.6%.

In the 2016 Scottish Parliament election Burnett stood as the Conservative Party candidate for the Aberdeenshire West constituency and won the seat with 38.1% of the vote, unseating the incumbent candidate SNP candidate Dennis Robertson who only received 35.5%. Burnett has been re-selected by the Scottish Conservatives as the candidate for Aberdeenshire West in the 2021 Scottish Parliament election.

The Scottish Parliament's cross-party Standards Committee unanimously found that Burnett had broken the Parliament's code of conduct by submitting written questions while failing to indicate a financial interest in mid-September 2017, but did not apply any sanctions. However two weeks later the Committee again found that Burnett had broken the code of conduct in a similar way, and sanctioned the MSP by banning him from asking written questions for two weeks.

Burnett is the Conservative spokesperson for energy in the Scottish Parliament. He sits on the Environment, Climate Change and Land Reform Committee of the Scottish Parliament.

At the 2021 Scottish Parliament election Burnett was re-elected for Aberdeenshire West with an increased majority of 3,390 votes as his vote share rose by 9.1%. The Scotsman reported that the seat had been forecast to produce a close contest and his holding of it was seen as "a significant blow to the hopes of an outright SNP majority" in the Scottish Parliament as a result of the election.

Personal life
Burnett is married to Lavinia Cox, with whom he has three children: one son and two daughters.

Ancestry

References

External links 
 

1973 births
Living people
People educated at Eton College
Alumni of Newcastle University
Conservative MSPs
Members of the Scottish Parliament 2016–2021
Members of the Scottish Parliament 2021–2026
Scottish people of Russian descent
Scottish people of English descent
Scottish people of German descent
People from Banchory